Rosemary Patricia "Pebe" Sebert (born March 17, 1956) is an American singer and songwriter from Brentwood, Tennessee, and the mother of singer and songwriter Kesha. Sebert has co-written number-one hits for Dolly Parton, Pitbull, and Kesha, her daughter. Sebert and Kesha have written 11 published songs together. The songs Sebert wrote for other artists have combined sales of over 8 million copies in the United States alone. In 2013, Sebert appeared as a regular on reality show Kesha: My Crazy Beautiful Life, which starred Kesha and was filmed by her son Lagan.

Early life
Sebert was born on March 17, 1956, in Michigan City, Indiana, and her early years were spent on her parents' farm. She is of Hungarian descent. Pebe began singing and making up songs at age 4 and singing publicly by age six, and she trained as a singer and played piano and guitar. Sebert sang in groups, bands, and as a solo artist. She entered the prestigious Interlochen Arts Academy at age 15, where she participated in the exclusive Madrigal group, which toured by invitation in Europe. She also toured as a soprano with the American Youth Symphony and Choir. She began playing coffeehouses in Chicago and Europe throughout her high school years.

Career
In the 1970s, Sebert wrote "Old Flames Can't Hold a Candle to You" with then-husband Hugh Moffatt for American Country singer Joe Sun for his album Old Flames. Sun's version soon became a hit, peaking at No. 14 on the Billboard Hot Country Songs chart. Dolly Parton included a cover of the song on her 1980 album Dolly, Dolly, Dolly two years after Sun's version was released. Parton's version became a huge hit, reaching No. 1 on the Billboard Hot Country Songs chart. "Old Flames Can't Hold a Candle to You" was later covered by many artists, including Sebert's daughter Kesha for her extended play Deconstructed and her third studio album Rainbow.

In 2004, Sebert lent her vocals on X-Mas Balls' debut holiday album, She Left Me For Rudolph, singing "If I Was an Angel" with Ned McElroy and Jerry Williams.

In May 2005, Sebert and her two children Kesha and Lagan starred in an episode of the reality series The Simple Life which starred Paris Hilton and Nicole Richie. In the May 12, 2005 episode "The Wedding Planner," Sebert lets Hilton and Richie stay at her house while they attempt to plan a wedding and eventually try, with Kesha's help, to set Sebert up on a date.

In 2010, Sebert co-wrote her daughter Kesha's hit song "Your Love Is My Drug", which became a Top 10 single in nine countries and reached triple-platinum in the U.S. Later that year, Sebert and Kesha gave the song "Disgusting" to pop singer Miranda Cosgrove for her debut album, and contributed the title track for Miley Cyrus's debut EP, The Time of Our Lives.

In 2012, Sebert co-wrote "Warrior", "Dirty Love", "Wonderland", "Gold Trans Am", and "Out Alive" for Kesha's second album Warrior. Sebert also provided backing vocals for the tracks "Dirty Love", which featured Iggy Pop, and "Gold Trans Am".

In April 2013, Sebert appeared on Kesha's reality show Kesha: My Crazy Beautiful Life which was filmed by her son Lagan Sebert and aired on MTV. The first season (April 23, 2013 – May 28, 2013) documented Kesha's life as she embarked on her first solo tour and worked on her second album, Warrior. The second season featured Kesha spending more time at home taking a much-needed break, and featured Sebert's youngest son and Kesha's youngest brother, Louie, who hadn't appeared in the first season. Season two ran from October 30 to December 18, 2013.

In 2013, Sebert co-wrote Kesha and American rapper Pitbull's hit single "Timber", which was released on October 2, 2013, and became a Top 10 single in 28 countries and No. 1 in 12 countries.

On December 31, 2013, Kesha released a music video for "Dirty Love", which Sebert had co-written and for which she contributed vocals.

In 2017, Sebert co-produced Kesha's comeback album Rainbow which features two new tracks co-written by the duo ("Hymn" and "Learn To Let Go"), as well as a duet of "Old Flames Can't Hold a Candle to You", between Kesha and Parton. Sebert co-wrote the duet "Safe" with Kesha and her son Louie, who performed it alongside indie rapper Chika.

Personal life
Sebert was married to Hugh Moffatt, with whom she wrote "Old Flames Can't Hold a Candle to You", for seven years, separating in 1984. They had one child together, Lagan Sebert. She claims that after the divorce, she and Lagan lived on welfare payments and food stamps.

In 1987, Sebert gave birth to daughter Kesha Rose Sebert. Sebert frequently brought Kesha and her brothers along to recording studios and encouraged Kesha to sing. She moved the family to Nashville, Tennessee, in 1991 after securing a new publishing deal for her songwriting.

On October 12, 1999, Sebert's second son, Louis Sage "Louie" Sebert, was born, though he was adopted. He appeared in an episode of the television series Victorious alongside Kesha.

Through Lagan, Pebe has two grandchildren.

After Sebert and Kesha claimed that they didn't know who Kesha's father was, Bob Chamberlain approached Star in 2011 with pictures and letters, claiming them as proof that he and Kesha had been in regular contact as father and daughter before she turned 19.

Sebert checked into Timberline Knolls Residential Treatment Center in Lemont, Illinois, for rehab in January 2014, claiming that she had post-traumatic stress disorder from the trauma of Kesha being attacked by her record label and Dr. Luke. 
Sebert has admitted that she is a recovering drug addict and alcoholic and had taken Kesha to Alcoholics Anonymous meetings with her since Kesha was a year old.

Discography

Awards and nominations
BMI Pop Music Awards
2010 ("Your Love Is My Drug" Kesha)

Filmography

References

External links
 

1956 births
American women country singers
American country singer-songwriters
American women singer-songwriters
Kesha
Living people
Singer-songwriters from Tennessee
American women pop singers